Zeydun District is a district (bakhsh) in Behbahan County, Khuzestan Province, Iran. At the 2006 census, its population was 14,839, in 3,220 families.  The District has one city: Sardasht. The District has two rural districts (dehestan): Dorunak Rural District and Sardasht Rural District.

References 

Behbahan County
Districts of Khuzestan Province